Girls Get Busy is the third and final studio album by Bratmobile, released in 2002 on Lookout! Records.

Track listing

Critical reception

Girls Get Busy features a more polished production than the band's previous releases, and even introduces keyboards to many songs, but the album still represents a clear continuation of the group's original punk sound and riot grrrl spirit.

Personnel

Bratmobile
 Molly Neuman, drums
 Erin Smith, guitar
 Allison Wolfe, vocals

Contributing artists
Filmmaker Audrey Marrs contributed keyboards and background vocals. Additional background vocals were provided by Joey Karam and Andy Peterson; record producer Marty Key is credited for additional guitar and bass.

Production
The album was produced by Marty Key, Aaron Prellwitz, and Bratmobile. Prellwitz and Brian Barnes served as engineers and mixers. The album cover design was created by Chris Appelgren.

References

2002 albums
Bratmobile albums
Lookout! Records albums